A Swedish battalion during the mid 17th century up to the mid 18th century was the smallest tactical unit in combat. The 600 man unit was formed, temporarily, at the inception of a battle by joining four foot companies from a foot regiment of eight companies. The commander of the regiment, an Överste (Colonel), led the first battalion and his deputy, an Överstelöjtnant (Lieutenant Colonel), the second battalion. Battalion commanders and all other officers marched in front of the formation. Non-commissioned officers (underofficers) marched beside and behind to prevent desertion, and to replace officers who were killed. In addition to his principal duties, senior officers, such as Majors, the Överstelöjtnant and Överste, also commanded a company. So that the Överste could focus on the operations of his regiment and first battalion, command of his company was delegated to a Kaptenlöjtnant. During battle, each officer, except the Fänriks, was in charge of a portion of his company. Underofficer (NCO) ranks comprised Furir, Förare, Fältväbel,  Sergeant and Rustmästare.

Tactics -- Infantry vs Infantry 
The formation marched toward the enemy, accompanied by drums, to within   from the enemy's line. There, it halted for the third and fourth rows of musketeers to aim and open fire. The march continued some  further and halted again for the first and second rows of musketeers to aim and open fire. The zombie like appearance of rapidly approaching Swedes, along with major casualties from the first and second blasts, should induce the enemy to panic and flee, allowing Swedish swords and pikes to kill enemies on the run. It was rare for opposing forces to engage each other in close combat with swords and pikes.  Light artillery units were sometimes placed in the gap between battalions – a practice in use at the end of the Great Northern War.

Tactics - Infantry vs Cavalry 
An effective formation to counter cavalry attacks, was to line up the whole regiment into one huge battalion of six lines.

The first two lines consisted of musketeers, the second two of pikemen and the last two musketeers. In this formation, the Major was in charge of the center, the Överstelöjtnant the left wing and the Överste the right wing.

See also 
 Swedish allotment system
 Great Northern War
 Field Artillery (early 18th century)

References 
 "Karl XII på slagfältet", Generalstaben, 1918 
 
 "Stora Nordiska Kriget 1700-1721", Lars-Eric Höglund och Åke Sallnäs, 2000 
  

 
Military history of Sweden.